Defending champion Novak Djokovic defeated Roger Federer in the final, 7–6(7–5), 1–6, 7–6(7–4), 4–6, 13–12(7–3) to win the gentlemen's singles tennis title at the 2019 Wimbledon Championships. At four hours and 57 minutes in length, it was the longest singles final in Wimbledon history. It was Djokovic's fifth Wimbledon title and 16th major title overall. Djokovic became the first man since Bob Falkenburg in 1948 to win the title after being championship points down, having saved two when down 7–8 in the fifth set. This was the first time since the 2004 French Open that a man saved championship points in order to win a major. Djokovic became the second man and third singles player overall to win multiple Grand Slam titles after saving match point during the tournament, after Rod Laver and Serena Williams. Conversely, this was the third time that an opponent of Federer saved match points and went on to win the major, following Marat Safin in the 2005 Australian Open and Djokovic in the 2011 US Open.

At this event, Federer reached his 31st and last major final. His semifinal meeting with Rafael Nadal also marked their 40th and final professional meeting; Federer won in four sets to end their head-to-head at 24–16 in Nadal's favor. At , Federer became the oldest man to reach a major final since Ken Rosewall in the 1974 US Open.

This was the first Wimbledon where a final set tie break rule was introduced. Upon reaching 12–12 in the fifth set, a classic tie break would be played. The men's singles final was the first singles match at Wimbledon in which the new rule came into effect, with Djokovic winning the tie break 7–3. Additionally, it was the first men's singles final at any major to feature a final-set, championship-deciding tiebreak.

Stan Wawrinka was attempting to complete the career Grand Slam but lost to Reilly Opelka in the second round.

This tournament also marked the final professional appearance for former Australian Open finalist Marcos Baghdatis; he lost in the second round.

Seeds
All seedings per modified ATP rankings.

Qualifying

Draw

Finals

Top half

Section 1

Section 2

Section 3

Section 4

Bottom half

Section 5

Section 6

Section 7

Section 8

Championship match ratings
3.329 million on ESPN, in the USA

References

External links
 Gentlemen's Singles draw
 2019 Wimbledon Championships – Men's draws and results at the International Tennis Federation

Men's Singles
Wimbledon Championships - Men's Singles
2019